Laura Terracina (1519-c. 1577) was an Italian poet from Naples during the Renaissance. She was the most published Italian poet of the sixteenth century.

Life
Terracina was born in Chiaia, a suburb of Naples. Her mother, Diana Anfora of Sorrento and father, Paolo Terracina, had at least one more daughter and two sons. She may have received encouragement from the famous poet Vittoria Colonna, who possibly sent her a brief poem praising her talents. 
In 1545, she became a member of the Academia of the Incogniti in Naples, and knew and corresponded with several literari figures. Despite the suppression of the academy in 1547, she continued to be known by her academy pseudonym of Febea.

She married her relative Polidoro Terracina and sometimes addressed poems to him. She had befriended many influential people of her day, like the patroness Giovanna d'Aragona and the writer Angelo di Costanzo.

Work
She published nine volumes of poetry, in Florence, Venice, Naples and Lucca between 1548 and 1567. In Venice, she published the chivalric romance Discorso sopra il Principio di Tutti I Canti di Orlando Furioso, a poem linked to Ludovico Ariosto's Orlando Furioso, which was reprinted thirteen times. In it she defended women from their detractors, but laments that not more have literary pursuits.

Sometimes she dedicated poems to those she had met at the Academia of the Incogniti. In the many poems she wrote in praise of others, she generally spoke of her unworthiness as a poet. She exchanged poems of praise with Laura Battiferri, in which the two women praised the other, but trivialized their own talents.

During her lifetime she was lauded for her work. In some of her works she deplores social disturbances and political turmoil. She also insisted that women should pursue fame for their work and addressed her seventh book to the widows of Naples.

The National Library of Florence holds more than two hundred of her uncollected poems in a manuscript dated 1577.

Notes

References

External links
 

Italian women poets
16th-century Italian women writers
16th-century Italian writers
Italian Renaissance writers
1519 births